Janina-Kristin Götz (born 10 January 1981) is a German swimmer, who won bronze medal in the 2004 Summer Olympics.

At the Athens she swam in 4×200 m freestyle distance heats.

References

External links
 

German female swimmers
Olympic swimmers of Germany
Living people
1981 births
Olympic bronze medalists for Germany
Swimmers at the 2004 Summer Olympics
Olympic bronze medalists in swimming
Sportspeople from Bayreuth
European Aquatics Championships medalists in swimming
Medalists at the 2004 Summer Olympics